Monique Van Haver (born 31 August 1948) is a Belgian former professional tennis player.

Biography
Van Haver was a regular member of the Belgium Federation Cup team throughout the 1970s. She featured in a total of 30 ties during her career, with a 22/28 overall win–loss record from 50 matches. 

Her doubles partnership with Michèle Gurdal resulted in 11 Federation Cup wins and is Belgium's most successful. The pair made the women's doubles quarter-finals together at the 1976 French Open.

Following her retirement, Van Haver worked as a tennis coach around Brussels.

References

External links
 
 
 

1948 births
Living people
Belgian female tennis players
20th-century Belgian women